Mohamed Arab (born 23 December 1948) is a veteran politician, who has served as Egypt's former minister of culture in different cabinets, including the Beblawi cabinet.

Early life
Arab was born on 23 December 1948.

Career
Arab worked as a professor of modern Arab history at Al Azhar University in Egypt from 1974 to 2011. He was a visiting professor at Sultan Qaboos University in Muscat, Oman from 1986 to 1991 and at Emirates University in 1994. He also worked as a professor of modern history at the Arabian Researches and Studies Institute of the Arab League in Egypt 1994 to 2011. In addition, he was the chairman of the National Library and Archives of Egypt (2005–2009) and of the Egypt's general authority for books and national documents (2009–2011). In 2011, he retired from public post and became culture committee reporter at the National Council of Women.

Arab served as the minister of culture in the interim government headed by Kamal Ganzouri. He resigned from his post in July 2012. However, he continued to serve in the same post in the Qandil cabinet that became effective in August 2012. On 4 February 2013, he resigned again in protest of brutal violence against protesters. On 7 May 2013, Alaa Abdel-Aziz El-Sayed Abdel-Fattah was appointed culture minister in a cabinet reshuffle to succeed him in the post.

Arab was reappointed culture minister to the interim government led by Hazem Al Beblawi on 16 July 2013. Arab's term ended on 17 June 2014, and he was replaced by Gaber Asfour in the post.

Awards
Arab is the Egyptian State Award winner in social sciences of 2012 that was given in July 2012.

References

External links

21st-century Egyptian politicians
1948 births
Academic staff of Al-Azhar University
Beblawi Cabinet
Culture ministers of Egypt
Living people
Qandil Cabinet
Independent politicians in Egypt
People from Desouk